The Forti FG01, also designated Forti FG01-95, was a Formula One car for the 1995 season and was the first car made by Forti. The number 21 seat was taken by rookie Pedro Diniz and the number 22 seat was taken by veteran Roberto Moreno. The team never employed a test driver. The engine was a Ford EDD 3.0 V8. The team's main sponsor was Parmalat. The FG01 is also notably the last F1 car to sport a conventional manual gearbox + H-pattern shifter, and was the only car to use one on the grid.

The car was designed by Giacomo Caliri and Giorgio Stirano, with input from Sergio Rinland, and was built at the team's base in Alessandria, Italy.

Concept
Building its own car for the first time was the hardest task for the team (as required by the F1 regulations). This turned out to be the main obstacle for Guido Forti, as he insisted on having a reliable car built instead of a fast one. That was precisely what he received: his first F1 car, the Forti FG01, was an outdated, overweight and very slow machine, and has been described as nothing more than "a revised F3000 car" and, more harshly, "a fearful pile of junk".

The FG01 had many influences. Its roots dated back to  when former Brabham designer Rinland left the British team before the season ended. Rinland set up Astauto Ltd. in Tolworth, England, hiring several of his former collaborators from Brabham when the team closed its doors. Brabham sold the building and wind tunnel at Chessington to Yamaha, facilities that Astauto rented to develop the new Fondmetal GR02, which was designed and built by June 1992, just six months after it was commissioned by Gabriele Rumi. The Fondmetal GR02 was a natural successor of the Brabham BT60, in concept, as it was conceived by the same design team. Due to Fondmetal's own severe financial troubles, the GR02 was run only in a few races before the team was closed. When in late , Forti bought the remains of the Fondmetal Team, acquiring all the spares of the GR02 in the process, the team then turned to Rinland to purchase the design of what would have been the  F1 car design by the Astauto Design Team after the collapse of the Fondmetal team. At that time, Rinland was living and working in California on a new ChampCar project. Forti sent his Chief Designer and former Astauto employee Chris Radage to California to gather all the technical information, data and drawings from Rinland, returning to Italy to design and develop the new Forti FG01. Rinland joined the team in early 1995 for a short period as Technical Director, once he had returned to Europe. Rinland assisted experienced Italian engineers Giorgio Stirano and Giacomo Caliri in designing the car. The car's aerodynamics were completed by former Brabham employee Hans Fouche using wind-tunnels in South Africa, and composite work was done by the Belco Avia company. However, it was rumoured that the FG01 was little more than a re-working of the GR02.

Thus the FG01 did not promise much in terms of performance. It was angular and bulky, with poor aerodynamic performance negatively affecting grip and handling; it had a plump nose, initially no airbox, and was overweight and under-powered, using a small Ford-Cosworth ED V8 customer engine largely financed by Ford Brasil, which developed an estimated 100 bhp less than the most powerful engine in the field, the Renault V10 supplied to the Benetton and Williams teams. It was also the only car to have a manual gearbox in the 1995 F1 season. The only attractive thing about the car was its blue and yellow colour scheme accompanied by fluorescent green wheel-rims, illustrating the team's Brazilian influence in its first year. Rinland subsequently left the team after a few weeks, after falling out with the team's management over the car's lack of competitiveness.

For 1996, the car was upgraded to B specification, with Luca Badoer and Andrea Montermini on board. It was eventually replaced by the Forti FG03 car for the Monaco Grand Prix.

Complete Formula One World Championship results
(key)

References

Footnotes

Books

External links

1995 Formula One season cars
1996 Formula One season cars
Forti Formula One cars